The 2000 season was the Detroit Lions' 71st in the National Football League (NFL). After a wildcard playoff appearance with an 8–8 record in 1999, the Lions improved to 9–7 in 2000, but missed the playoffs thanks to a Christmas Eve home loss to the 4–11 Chicago Bears, where they blew a 10-point lead in the second quarter.

In the first 12 games, the Lions were 8-4. But, after that, they only won one more time. Nonetheless, this was the Lions' sixth winning season in 10 years, capping one of the best decades in the franchise's history. It was also the franchise's last winning season until 2011.

Head coach Bobby Ross resigned after the ninth game of the season and was replaced by Gary Moeller. 

After beating the Jets, 10–7, at Giants Stadium on December 17, the Lions would lose 24 road games in a row and go 0–8 on the road for the coming three years.

Offseason

NFL Draft

Personnel

Staff

Roster

Preseason

Regular season

Schedule

Game summaries

Week 6

Standings

References

External links 
 Detroit Lions on Pro Football Reference
 Detroit Lions on jt-sw.com

Detroit
Detroit Lions seasons
Detroit Lions